Shala is a Babylonian and Akkadian goddess. 

Shala may also refer to:

 Shala (film), a 2011 Marathi-language film
 Shala (Kuloy), a tributary of the Nemnyuga in Russia
 Shala (region), a region of northern Albania in the valley of the river Shalë
 Shala (river), a tributary of the Drin in Albania
 Shala (surname)
 Shala (tree), a romanization of the Sanskrit name for the sal tree (Shorea robusta )
 Shala (tribe), an Albanian tribe
 Lake Shala, a lake in Ethiopia

See also
 Sala (disambiguation)